Jharkhand Vikas Morcha (Prajatantrik) (JVM (P)) ( 'Jharkhand Development Front (Democratic)') was a state political party in the Indian state of Jharkhand which was founded by former Union Minister and First Chief Minister of Jharkhand, Babulal Marandi.

Formation
The party's formation was announced by Marandi at Hazaribagh on 24 September 2006. Marandi was earlier a member of the Bharatiya Janata Party, but he quit in mid-2006 because he felt he was being sidelined in the party.

Six JVM(P) MLAs on 11 Feb 2015 joined the BJP, a day after petitioning the Speaker to allow them to sit alongside the ruling BJP-led coalition members in the state Assembly. Naveen Jaiswal (Hatia), Amar Kumar Bauri (Chandankiyari), Ganesh Ganju (Simaria), Alok Kumar Chourasia (Daltonganj), Randhir Kumar Singh (Sarath) and Janki Yadav (Barkatha) joined the BJP at the Jharkhand Bhavan in New Delhi.

Merger with BJP

Jharkhand Vikas Morcha (Prajatantrik) led by Babulal Marandi merged with the  Bharatiya Janata Party  on February 17, 2020, at Jagannathpur Maidan, Ranchi in presence of Union Home Minister Amit Shah, BJP president Jagat Prakash Nadda and former Chief Ministers of Jharkhand Arjun Munda and Raghubar Das. Earlier, Marandi expelled MLAs Pradeep Yadav and Bandhu Tirkey from the party for “anti-party activities”. Both of them later joined Indian National Congress in its Delhi headquarters.

References

External links
 Jharkhand Vikas Morcha , Official website

.

 
Political parties established in 2006
Bharatiya Janata Party breakaway groups
Political parties in India
Political parties disestablished in 2020
2006 establishments in Jharkhand
2020 disestablishments in India